Moon mirror may refer to:

 List of retroreflectors on the Moon, a collection of reflective devices placed on the surface of the Moon by the Apollo and Lunokhod missions.
 Moon Mirror a collection of fantasy and science fiction short stories by Andre Norton.